Shaikh Hamad bin Jassim bin Hamad bin Abdullah bin Jassim bin Muhammed Al Thani (born 1959) was the commander in chief of the Qatar Police from 1972 to 1977 and Minister for Economy and Trade from 1977 to 1986.

Education

Born in Doha, he finished his primary and high school in Qatar, and later was sent to the American University of Beirut, Lebanon. He then attended police course training in the Royal Military Academy Sandhurst.

1996 Qatari coup d'état attempt

Sheikh Hamad bin Jassim bin Hamad was found guilty of staging an abortive coup to restore the current emir's father Khalifa bin Hamad Al Thani to the throne in 1996. He stayed abroad for over three years, before in 1998 Qatari secret forces directed his private jet on a flight from Beirut in midair to Qatar. He was sentenced to hanging along with 32 co-conspirators, 21 May 2001. However, he was released in 2008.

Children

 Khalifa bin Hamad.
 Khalid bin Hamad.
 Jassim bin Hamad.
 Abdulrahman bin Hamad.
 Sultan bin Hamad.
 Sheikha bint Hamad.

References

AR: SHK Hamad Page In Althani Family Tree
AR: Althani Family Tree

Hamad bin Jassim bin Hamad Al Thani
Living people
Government ministers of Qatar
Chiefs of police
People from Doha
1949 births
American University of Beirut alumni
Graduates of the Royal Military Academy Sandhurst